Naked Sea is a 1954 American documentary film which follows the journey of the tuna-fishing boat the Star-Kist, on a four-month 15,000 mile journey fishing off the coast of South America. The film was produced, directed, shot and edited by Allen H. Miner. It was narrated by William Conrad, and was originally shot on 16mm film, then blown up to 35mm (with no apparent loss of quality) for theatrical distribution. The fishing boat used its normal crew, captained by Joachim Qualen.

Critical reception
Allmovie wrote, "one of the best of the many feature-length documentaries distributed by RKO Radio in the mid-1950s...As the fishermen go about their appointed tasks, the camera soaks in a lot of local color, including a raging South American hurricane and the eruption of a Galápagos Islands volcano."

References

External links

American documentary films
1954 documentary films
1954 films
Documentary films about fishing
Films shot in 16 mm film
1950s English-language films
1950s American films